Vinge is a surname shared by several notable people, among them being:

 Joan D. Vinge (born 1948), an American science fiction author
 Vernor Vinge (born 1944), a retired San Diego State University Professor of Mathematics, computer scientist, and science fiction author

See also
 Ving (disambiguation)